is a 1958 Japanese film by director Shohei Imamura. This was Imamura's second film as director.

Plot 
This short comedy concerns the attempts by the henpecked husband of a drugstore manager to have an extramarital affair while his wife is away for the weekend. It is based on a popular song by Frank Nagai, who sings and narrates in the film.

See also
 1958 in film

References

External links
 
 movie poster

Films directed by Shohei Imamura
1958 films
1958 comedy films
1950s Japanese-language films
Japanese comedy films
Nikkatsu films
1950s Japanese films